Lucas Ng Jun Jie (born 13 October 1988) is a Singaporean short track speed skater. He became the first Singaporean athlete to compete at a major winter sport event at the 2011 Asian Winter Games. His participation drew praise from parliamentary secretary Teo Ser Luck who said "We should just celebrate the fact that Singapore has its first winter athlete. We've never had a winter athlete and this in itself is a breakthrough." In August 2017, Ng suffered a serious injury due to a training accident in which a tendon in his right hand was severed by the blade of a skater who fell down in front of him. He underwent surgery requiring ten stitches, but ten days later had recovered sufficiently from his injuries to win the silver medal in the men's 1000 metres in short track speed skating at the 2017 Southeast Asian Games.

References

External links
  (ISU)
Lucas Ng at the Singapore Ice Skating Association (SISA)

1988 births
Living people
Singaporean male short track speed skaters
Southeast Asian Games silver medalists for Singapore
Southeast Asian Games medalists in short track speed skating
Short track speed skaters at the 2011 Asian Winter Games
Short track speed skaters at the 2017 Asian Winter Games
Competitors at the 2017 Southeast Asian Games
Competitors at the 2019 Southeast Asian Games
Southeast Asian Games gold medalists for Singapore